The 2021 Western Kentucky Hilltoppers football team represented Western Kentucky University during the 2021 NCAA Division I FBS football season. The Hilltoppers played their home games at Houchens Industries–L. T. Smith Stadium in Bowling Green, Kentucky, and competed in the East Division of Conference USA (CUSA). The team was coached by third-year head coach Tyson Helton.

Previous season

The Hilltoppers finished the 2020 regular season 5–7 and 4–3 in C–USA play to finish in third in the East Division. They were invited to play in the LendingTree Bowl, which they lost to Georgia State.

Schedule 
Western Kentucky announced its 2021 football schedule on January 27, 2021. The 2021 schedule consists of 6 home and 6 away games in the regular season.

Schedule Source:

Game summaries

UT Martin

at Army

Indiana

at Michigan State

UTSA

at Old Dominion

at FIU

Charlotte

Middle Tennessee

at Rice

Florida Atlantic

at Marshall

at UTSA (C-USA Championship)

vs. Appalachian State (Boca Raton Bowl)

References

Western Kentucky
Western Kentucky Hilltoppers football seasons
Boca Raton Bowl champion seasons
Western Kentucky Hilltoppers